Pierre Yergeau (born 4 October 1957) is a Canadian novelist.

Born in Abitibi, Quebec, Yergeau was educated at Concordia University and the Université de Montréal. He has twice been a finalist for the Governor General's Award in French language fiction. He is considered one of the most important Canadian novelists, with a dry sense of humour, tendency towards ironic reflections on the American dream, and a brilliant use of rhetoric. Even though his novel L'écrivain public received critical acclaim and was later released in a paperback edition, he remains relatively unknown outside Quebec due to lack of translation.

Yergeau lives in the region of Lanaudière with his wife and four children.

References

External links
Critical bibliography database (Auteurs.contemporain.info) 

1957 births
Living people
Canadian male novelists
Writers from Quebec
Canadian novelists in French